The 2021 New York City borough president elections were held on November 2, 2021. Four of the five incumbent borough presidents were unable to run for reelection due to term limits. Only the Queens borough president was eligible to seek re-election after winning a special election in 2020 (and won re-election).

The winning candidates were as follows:
Manhattan: Mark Levine, New York City Council member (Democratic)
Brooklyn: Antonio Reynoso, New York City Council member (Democratic)
Queens: Donovan Richards, incumbent borough president (Democratic)
The Bronx: Vanessa Gibson, New York City Council member (Democratic)
Staten Island: Vito Fossella, former U.S. Representative (Republican)

Overview

Manhattan

Incumbent Democrat Gale Brewer was term-limited and could not run for a third consecutive term.

Democratic primary

Declared
Lindsey Boylan, former Deputy Secretary for Economic Development and Special Advisor to the Governor, candidate for New York's 10th congressional district in 2020
Elizabeth R. Caputo, former Chair of Manhattan's Community Board 7
Brad Hoylman, state senator for the 27th district
Ben Kallos, councilmember
Mark Levine, councilmember
Guillermo Perez, candidate for New York State Assembly District 71 in 2018
Kimberly R. Watkins, President of Community Education Council

Declined
Ydanis Rodriguez, councilmember

Withdrew
Thomas Lopez-Pierre, candidate for New York City Council District 7 in 2017

Endorsements

Polling

First-past-the-post polls

Results

Republican primary

Declared
Lou Puliafito, candidate for New York State Assembly in 2020

Endorsements

Libertarian Party

Declared
Michael Lewyn, law professor at Touro Law Center

General election

Results

Brooklyn

Incumbent Democrat Eric Adams is term-limited and cannot run for a third consecutive term.

Democratic primary
Twelve candidates made it on the ballot in the Democratic primary, of which three were regarded as the frontrunners; City Councilmembers Robert Cornegy and Antonio Reynoso, and State Assemblymember Jo Anne Simon.

Declared
Robert Cornegy, councilmember
Kimberly Council, non-profit executive
Khari Edwards, activist
Robert Elstein, artist and teacher
Mathieu Eugene, councilmember
Pearlene Fields, member of Brooklyn Community Board 17
Anthony Jones, District Leader for the 55th State Assembly District
Shanduke McPhatter, activist
Trisha Ocona, businesswoman
Robert Ramos Jr., labor unionist
Antonio Reynoso, councilmember
Jo Anne Simon, assemblymember
Lamor Whitehead-Miller, pastor

Withdrew
Rafael Espinal, councilmember
Emmanuel Whitmore

Declined 
Chirlane McCray, First Lady of New York City

Endorsements

Polling

Ranked-choice polls

First-past-the-post polls

Results

General election

Results

Queens

Incumbent Democrat Donovan Richards assumed office in December 2020 after winning the November special election, and is running for a full term. He succeeded Sharon Lee, who became acting Borough President after Melinda Katz resigned to take office as Queens County District Attorney.

Democratic primary

Declared
Elizabeth Crowley, former councilmember, candidate for Queens Borough President in 2020
Donovan Richards, incumbent Borough President
Jimmy Van Bramer, councilmember

Withdrew
Alicia Hyndman, New York State Assemblymember for the 29th district

Endorsements

Polling

Ranked-choice polls

First-past-the-post polls

Results

Republican Primary

Declared
Thomas Zmich, 2020 candidate for New York's 6th congressional district, retired union leader and organizer
 Danniel Maio, local activist and 2016 candidate for the New York's 6th congressional district

Endorsements

Results

The Bronx

Incumbent Democrat Rubén Díaz Jr. is term-limited and cannot run for a fourth consecutive term.

Democratic primary

Declared
Fernando Cabrera, councilmember
Nathalia Fernandez, assemblymember for the 80th district
Vanessa Gibson, councilmember
Victor H. Gutierrez
Bryan Hodge Vasquez
Luis R. Sepúlveda, state senator for the 32nd district

Endorsements

Polling

Ranked-choice polls

First-past-the-post polls

Results

Official results for each round are as follows:

Results

Staten Island

Incumbent Republican James Oddo is term-limited and cannot run for a third consecutive term.

Republican primary

Declared
Vito Fossella, former U.S. Representative
Jhong Kim, businessman
Steven Matteo, councilmember
Leticia Remauro, businesswoman

Endorsements

Results

Democratic primary

Declared

Lorraine Honor, activist and businesswoman
Radhakrishna Mohan, labor unionist
Mark Murphy, businessman and nominee for New York's 11th congressional district in 2012
Brandon Stradford, community advocate
Cesar Vargas, attorney and reservist

Endorsements

Results

General election

Results

See also
 2021 New York City mayoral election
 2021 New York City Comptroller election
 2021 New York City Council election

Notes

Partisan clients

References

New York City Borough President
Borough President 2021
Election 2021
New York City Borough President
Borough president elections